A rooster is a male chicken.

Rooster or roosters may also refer to:

Places
 Rooster River, Connecticut, USA; a river
 Rooster Comb, a ridge in Coe State Park, California, USA
 Rooster Rock State Park, Oregon, USA
 Rooster Rock, a basalt column in Rooster Rock State Park
 Rooster Bridge, Ljubljana, Slovenia; a footbridge

Food
Rooster potato, a red-skinned potato with floury yellow flesh
Rooster olives, a style of olives
Rooster bowl, a traditional Chinese pottery design
Big Rooster (restaurant), a chicken fast food chain in Papua
Rooster's Brewery, a small independent brewery in Knaresborough, North Yorkshire

Entertainment

Fictional characters
Rooster Bennett, from the Netflix show The Ranch
Rooster Cogburn (character), from the novel True Grit and film adaptations
Daniel "Rooster" Hannigan, from the musical Annie and adaptations

Film
Rooster (film), a 1982 American television film
Roosters (film), a 1993 American film

Music

Bands
Rooster (band), a British indie rock band, from London, formed in 2003
The Roosters, also known as The Roosterz, a Japanese rock band
The Roosters (Californian band), 1960s house band at the Cinnamon Cinder club
The Roosters, an American band headed by Jerry Butler, later changing their name to Jerry Butler & The Impressions
The Roosters, band of guitarist Eric Clapton before joining the Yardbirds

Albums and songs
Rooster (album), a 2005 album by the British band Rooster
"Rooster" (song), a song by Alice in Chains
"The Rooster", a song by OutKast from Speakerboxxx/The Love Below

Television
"Rooster", a 2005 episode of the animated television series 12 oz. Mouse
Roosters (Millennium), an ideological faction and episode in the television series Millennium

Sports
Rooster Cup, figure skating 
Rooster 8.1, a special rig for the Laser sailboat.
Rooster Sailing, a sailing wear company.

Sports teams
"Rooster", a nickname for, and the mascot of, the Brazilian football club Clube Atlético Mineiro
North Adelaide Roosters, an Australian rules football team in the South Australian National Football League (SANFL)
Altona Roosters, a rugby league team in Victoria, Australia
North Ballarat Roosters, an Australian rules football team in the Victorian Football League
Bligh Roosters, a rugby union team in Fiji
Bremen Roosters, a basketball team in Bremen, Germany
Des Moines Roosters, an Australian Football team in Iowa, USA
Fremantle Roosters, a rugby league club in Fremantle, Australia
Helsinki Roosters, A Finnish American football team in Helsinki, Finland
Iserlohn Roosters, an ice hockey club in Iserlohn, Germany
St Ives Roosters, a rugby league team in Cambridgeshire, UK
Nerang Roosters, a rugby league team in Queensland, Australia
Port City Roosters, a baseball team in North Carolina, USA
Richmond Roosters, a baseball team in Richmond, Indiana, USA
Rochester Roosters, a cross-state baseball team in Wisconsin-Minnesota, USA
Sabeto Roosters, a rugby league team in Fiji
Salford City Roosters, a British rugby league team in Manchester, England, UK
Saluzzo Roosters, an Italian rugby league team in Saluzzo, Piedmont, Italy
Sydney Roosters, an Australian rugby league team in the Australian National Rugby League (NRL)
Sydney Roosters Juniors
Te Atatu Roosters, a rugby league team in Te Atatu, New Zealand
Thirlmere-Tahmoor Roosters, a rugby league team in New South Wales, Australia

Other uses
Rooster (application), a mobile reading service for iOS7
Rooster (zodiac), the Chinese zodiac symbol
Rooster Men, a VietCong nickname for soldiers in the 101st Airborne Division
Operation Rooster 53, Israeli military operation

See also

 Rooster tail, a spray tail of water
El Gallo (disambiguation) (Spanish for "the rooster")
Red Rooster (disambiguation)
Rooster Flag (disambiguation)
Roster (disambiguation)